The 1956 Little All-America college football team is composed of college football players from small colleges and universities who were selected by the Associated Press (AP) as the best players at each position. For 1956, the AP selected three teams of 11 players each, with no separate defensive platoons.

Senior back William Rhodes of Western State (Colorado) rushed for 1,200 yards on 130 carries. His total of 327 yards against Adam State set a single-game college football record. His career average of 8.49 yards per carry was the highest in college football history, and his career total of 4,294 rushing yards ranked second best in college football history.

Another senior back, Larry Houdek of Kansas Wesleyan, rushed for 1,432 yards and 19 touchdowns (114 points) on 168 carries. He also passed for two touchdowns.

James "Jimmy" Stehlin of Brandeis University, tallied 1,566 yards of total offense on 1,155 passing yards and 411 rushing yards.

Running back Nate Clark, an African American from Benton Harbor, Michigan, led Hillsdale College to its second consecutive undefeated season and was named to the first team for the second consecutive year. 

Others receiving first-team honors for the second consecutive year were end Charles Schultz or Alfred, tackle Vince Vidas of Drexel, and guard Steve Myhra of North Dakota.

First team
 Back - James Stehlin (senior, 6'0", 170 pounds), Brandeis
 Back - Nate Clark (senior, 5'8", 195 pounds), 
 Back - Larry Houdek (senior, 5'11", 175 pounds), Kansas Wesleyan
 Back - William Rhodes (senior, 6'1", 205 pounds), Western State (Colorado)
 End - Charles Schultz (senior, 6'1", 185 pounds), Alfred
 End - Milton Robichaux (senior, 6'6", 215 pounds), Trinity (Texas)
 Tackle - Don Owens (senior, 6'6", 248 pounds), Mississippi Southern
 Tackle - Vincent Vidas (senior, 6'2", 215 pounds), Drexel
 Guard - Steve Myhra (senior, 6'2", 230 pounds), North Dakota
 Guard - Bob Mitchell (senior, 6'0", 233 pounds), Puget Sound
 Center - William Earp (senior, 6'0", 178 pounds), Emory & Henry

Second team
 Back - Bill Englehardt, Omaha
 Back - Jim Podoley, Central Michigan
 Back - Al Frazier, Florida A&M
 Back - William "Whizzer" White, Westminster (Pennsylvania)
 End - Steve Junker, Xavier (Ohio)
 End - James Cox, California Poly
 Tackle - George Kurker, Tufts
 Tackle - Ron Warzeka, Montana State (NAIA national champion)
 Guard - Arden Ray, Lenoir-Rhyne
 Guard - Charles Froehle, St. John's (Minnesota)
 Center - Hall Whitley, Texas A&I

Third team
 Back - Bobby Grisham, Sam Houston (Refrigerator Bowl champion)
 Back - Dick Jamieson, Bradley
 Back - Terry Sweeney, Middle Tennessee
 Back - Larry Thomson, Air Force
 End - George Benedict, Springfield (Massachusetts)
 End - Albert Hill, Penn Military
 Tackle - Lyle Slater, Milliken
 Tackle - George Rice, Wofford
 Guard - John McMurry, Whittier
 Guard - Wixie Robinson, Pepperdine
 Center - Lee Glenn, Sewanee

See also
 1956 College Football All-America Team

References

Little All-America college football team
Little All-America college football team
Little All-America college football teams